Tile is a village located in the Jowhar District of the Shabeellaha Dhexe region of Somalia. It's mostly inhabited by the Xawaadle subclan of Hawiye

References

External links 
 Aerial view on Bing.com/maps

Populated places in Middle Shabelle
Populated coastal places in Somalia